L.E.F. Eden Garden Matriculation School is a school in Salem, Tamil Nadu. It was founded in 1979 under the administration of the Laymen's Evangelical Fellowship International, a Christian evangelical mission. The school is situated in the center of the city.

References

External links

 Official website
 Locate on Google Maps

High schools and secondary schools in Tamil Nadu
Christian schools in Tamil Nadu
Education in Salem, Tamil Nadu
Educational institutions established in 1979
1979 establishments in Tamil Nadu